Simon John Winstone (born 4 October 1974) is an English former footballer who played for Stoke City and Torquay United. He later managed Malmesbury Victoria.

Career
Winstone was born in Bristol and began his career with Stoke City. He was made captain of the club's reserve team but failed to earn a professional contract at the Victoria Ground and left for Torquay United. He made just two appearances for Torquay before leaving. In November 2011 he was appointed manager at Hellenic League side Malmesbury Victoria. He resigned as Malmesbury manager in April 2013.

Career statistics
Source:

References

1974 births
Living people
Footballers from Bristol
English footballers
Association football midfielders
Stoke City F.C. players
Torquay United F.C. players
English Football League players
English football managers
Malmesbury Victoria F.C. managers
Telford United F.C. players
Mangotsfield United F.C. players
Clevedon Town F.C. players
Paulton Rovers F.C. players
Yeovil Town F.C. players